The Jerer is an intermittent stream of eastern Ethiopia. A tributary of the Fafen River, it rises near Jijiga to flow in a south-easterly direction.

References
Jerer River

Rivers of Ethiopia
Shebelle River
Somali Region